Big Band and Quartet in Concert is the fifth album Thelonious Monk released for Columbia Records, featuring several Monk compositions.  It was recorded live at Lincoln Center, Philharmonic Hall, New York, New York on December 30, 1963.

It was called by reviewer Scott Yanow "essential for all jazz collections".

Track Listing 

The 1994 reissue on CD and LP restored the entire concert including selections and drum solos left off the original 1964 release.

Disc 1

 Bye-Ya* - 11:23
 I Mean You* - 12:49
 Evidence* - 14:03
 Epistrophy* - 2:07
 (When It’s) Darkness On The Delta ** - 5:15
 Played Twice*** - 7:48

Disc 2

1.  Misterioso*** - 9:52

2. Epistrophy*** - 1:18

3. Light Blue* - 12:53

4. Oska T* - 13:18

5. Four In One* - 14:43

6. Epistrophy* - 2:23

*Big Band

**Solo

***Quartet

Track Listing 1964 LP 
 "I Mean You" – 12:42
 "Evidence" – 12:38
 "(When It's) Darkness On The Delta" (Al Neiburg, Jerry Livingston, Marty Symes) – 5:03
 "Oska T." – 9:20
 "Played Twice" – 6:24
 "Four In One" – 11:03
 "Epistrophy" – 2:00

Personnel

Big Band Personnel 

 Nick Travis - Trumpet
 Thad Jones - Cornet
 Eddie Bert - Trombone
 Steve Lacy - Soprano Saxophone
 Phil Woods - Alto Saxophone, Clarinet 
 Charlie Rouse - Tenor Saxophone
 Gene Allen - Baritone Saxophone, Bass Clarinet, Clarinet
 Hall Overton - Orchestra Arranger

Quartet 
 Charlie Rouse - Tenor Saxophone
 Butch Warren - Bass
 Frankie Dunlop - Drums

References 

Albums produced by Teo Macero
Thelonious Monk live albums
1964 live albums
Columbia Records live albums
Albums recorded at the Lincoln Center for the Performing Arts